Phaulernis dentella (also known as the scale-tooth lance-wing) is a moth of the  family Epermeniidae found in Asia and Europe. The moth was first described by Philipp Christoph Zeller in 1839.

Description
The wingspan is 9–10 mm. The forewings are blackish-brown, with a scattering of white scales and there is a distinct tuft on the dorsum. There is one generation per year with adults on wing in June and can occasionally be seen on the flowers of the larval foodplant.

The larvae feed on the seeds of burnet-saxifrage (Pimpinella saxifraga), bulbous chervil (Chaerophyllum bulbosum), rough chervil (Chaerophyllum temulum), ground elder (Aegopodium podagraria), hogweed (Heracleum sphondylium) and wild angelica (Angelica sylvestris). The larvae are yellowish with a dark brown head and live within seeds that are spun together. Larvae can be found from July and August. The species overwinters in the pupal stage in an open network cocoon.

Distribution
It is found in central and eastern Europe, the Caucasus and western Siberia.

References

Epermeniidae
Moths described in 1839
Moths of Asia
Moths of Europe
Taxa named by Philipp Christoph Zeller